The Thomas Austin House is a historic house located in Lehi, Utah. It was listed on the National Register of Historic Places on July 26, 1982.

Description and history 
The two-story, Victorian style house was built for English-born local rancher Thomas Austin in 1901 for $4,000. According to its NRHP nomination, it is "the best example in Lehi of Victorian domestic architecture." And: "At a time when eclecticism and irregularity in house design
was at a premium, the Austin House projects an asymmetry of massing and mixing of historical details which is truly exceptional."

References

Houses completed in 1901
Houses on the National Register of Historic Places in Utah
Houses in Utah County, Utah
Buildings and structures in Lehi, Utah
National Register of Historic Places in Utah County, Utah
Victorian architecture in Utah